The 2018–19 UMass Lowell River Hawks men's basketball team represented the University of Massachusetts Lowell in the 2018–19 NCAA Division I men's basketball season. The River Hawks split their home games between the Costello Athletic Center and the Tsongas Center, both of which are located in Lowell, Massachusetts, and they were led by sixth-year head coach Pat Duquette. They were members of the America East Conference. They finished the season 15–17, 7–9 in America East play to finish in a tie for fifth place. They lost in the quarterfinals of the America East tournament to Hartford.

Previous season
The River Hawks finished the 2017–18 season 12–18, 6–10 in the America East Conference play to finish in a tie for sixth place. In the America East tournament, they were defeated by UMBC in the quarterfinals.

Roster

Schedule and results

|-
!colspan=12 style=| Non-conference regular season

|-
!colspan=9 style=| America East Conference regular season

|-
!colspan=12 style=| America East tournament
|-

|-

Source

References

UMass Lowell River Hawks men's basketball seasons
UMass Lowell River Hawks
2018 in sports in Massachusetts